The Sushasan Express, an Indian Railways train service launched to mark former Prime Minister Atal Bihari Vajpayee's 91st birthday, commenced operations on 25 December 2014. The train runs from Gwalior, the birthplace of Vajpayee, to Gonda, the workplace of Vajpayee Ji via  and Lucknow. On 11 November the extended to Balrampur, where Vajpayee was elected for the first time to the Lok Sabha. It shares its rake with Gwalior–Pune Weekly Express.

History 

The Express sported a special number, 01111, on its maiden run. Narendra Singh Tomar, Minister for Steel and Mines and the MP from Gwalior, cleared the train to depart Gwalior from platform #4 at 1:20 pm, 10 minutes behind schedule. According to senior railway officials, regular operation of the Sushasan Express (11111/11112) started on 31 December 2014 from Gwalior, and on 1 January 2015 from Gonda.

Service

The Up train, Gwalior to Balrampur, has train number "22199". The Down train, Balrampur to Gwalior, has train number "22200".
The weekly train leaves Gwalior on Wednesday, and departs Gonda in order to return to Gwalior on Thursday.

Coach composition

Earlier the train used to run with conventional ICF rake consisting of 17 coaches :

 1 AC II Tier
 2 AC III Tier
 6 Sleeper coaches
 6 General
 2 Second-class Luggage/parcel van
  
From 18 September 2019, the conventional ICF rake was replaced by LHB rake. The present LHB rake comprises 14 coaches -
  
 1 AC II Tier
 2 AC III Tier
 6 Sleeper coaches
 3 General
 2 End-on-generators

Route and halts 

Having 10 halts between Gwalior and Balrampur, it takes 20 hours and 5 minutes for this train to complete its entire journey of 953 kilometers. The Up train, 11111, leaves Gwalior at 13:10 hrs. and reaches Balrampur at 09:15 hrs. The Down train, 11112, Leaves Balrampur at 11:55 hrs. and reaches Gwalior at 06:30 hrs on Friday.

The important halts of the train are:

Traction

Both trains are hauled by a Jhansi Loco Shed or Kanpur Loco Shed-based WAG-7 or electric locomotive from Gwalior to Gonda and from Gonda it is hauled by a Gonda Loco Shed-based WDP-4 diesel locomotive up until Balrampur, and vice versa.

Rake sharing

The train shares its rake with Pune–Gwalior Weekly Express

See also 

 Pune–Gwalior Weekly Express
 Chambal Express

Notes

References

Named passenger trains of India
Rail transport in Uttar Pradesh
Rail transport in Madhya Pradesh
Transport in Gwalior
Railway services introduced in 2014
Express trains in India
Balrampur district, Uttar Pradesh